Adèle Christiaens (born 28 January 1909, date of death unknown) was a Belgian fencer. She competed in the women's individual foil event at the 1936 and 1948 Summer Olympics.

References

External links
 

1909 births
Year of death missing
Belgian female foil fencers
Olympic fencers of Belgium
Fencers at the 1936 Summer Olympics
Fencers at the 1948 Summer Olympics
People from Ixelles
Sportspeople from Brussels